Robert Herman (1914–1997) was an American astronomer.

Robert or Bob Herman or Hermann may also refer to:
Robert Alfred Herman (1861–1927), mathematics coach in Cambridge
Robert Dixon Herman (1911–1990), U.S. federal judge
Bob Herman (sociologist) (Robert Dunton Herman, 1928–2021), American sociologist
Bob Herman (cricketer) (Robert Stephen Herman, born 1946), English cricketer
Robert J. Hermann (born 1933), NRO director
Robert Joseph Hermann (born 1934), Catholic bishop
Bob Hermann (1923–2020), American businessman and soccer executive
Robert Hermann (composer) (1869–1912), Swiss composer
Robert Hermann (mathematician) (1931–2020), American mathematician and mathematical physicist